Sailing/Yachting is an Olympic sport starting from the Games of the 1st Olympiad (1896 Olympics in Athens Greece. With the exception of 1904 and the canceled 1916 Summer Olympics, sailing has always been included on the Olympic schedule. The Sailing program of 1964 consisted of a total of five sailing classes (disciplines). For each class, seven races were scheduled; these took place from 12 to 23 October 1964 off the coast of Enoshima in Sagami Bay. The sailing was done on the triangular type Olympic courses.

Venue 

At the IOC session in 1959, Japan stated that yachting would take place in the port of Yokohama, as was the plan for 1940. Later, when it became clear that Yokohama was not suitable for Olympic-level sailing, it was decided that yachting events would be held off the coast of Enoshima Island in Kanagawa Prefecture on the bay of Sagami.  To meet the requirement at Enoshima it was decided to build a large scale harbour at Enoshima for the 1964 Olympics. The construction of a yacht harbor on the island was started in May 1961 and finished in July 1964. The total construction cost was  $6,027,778 USD.

A total of three race areas were created in Sagami bay. The Japanese Sea Self-Defense Forces vessels supported the race management and specially the placements of the marks.

Competition

Overview

Continents 
 Africa
 Asia
 Oceania
 Europe
 Americas

Countries

Classes (equipment) 

 = Male,  = Female,  = Open

Medal summary

Medal table

Remarks

Sailing 

 Stop-watches, for attachment to the knee, for each participant in the yacht races were distributed.
 A new Olympic trophy was introduced at the 1964 Summer Games (The Tokyo Trophy). It was the desire that this Trophy be awarded to those who display the highest qualities of sportsmanship. During the Tokyo Games, this new Trophy was awarded to the Flying Dutchman team of  who, according to the official IOC site: set an outstanding example of sportsmanship when they gave up their race to save the life of a fellow competitor. 

Sailors 

During the sailing regattas at the 1964 Summer Olympics among others the following persons were competing in the various classes:
 Royalties
 , Prince of Thailand, in the Dragon
 , future King of Norway, in the 5.5 Metre
 In the Finn
 , Record holder of competing in the largest number of Olympic games and sailmaker
 In the Flying Dutchman
 , Founder of Musto (company)
 , One of the most famous sailors ever
, Future ISAF president
 In the Star
 , Yacht designer and America's Cup skipper
 In the Dragon
 , Founder of North Sails
 In the 5.5 Metre
 , Chairman of Johnson & Johnson and Slazenger, in the 5.5 Metre
 , Author and Banker, in the 5.5 Metre
, Future Speaker of the Bahamas "House of the Assembly", in the 5.5 Metre

Notes

References 

Sailing at the 1964 Tokyo Summer Games. sports-reference.com
 
 
 
 

 

 
1964 Summer Olympics events
1964
1964 in sailing
Sailing competitions in Japan